Bengt Henrik Fjällberg (born 15 September 1961) is a Swedish former alpine skier. His greatest achievement is the slalom bronze in the 1982 World Championships in Schladming. He was trained by Hermann Nogler. Fjällberg and Ingemar Stenmark are second cousins.

References

1961 births
Swedish male alpine skiers
People from Storuman Municipality
Living people
People from Tärnaby
Sportspeople from Västerbotten County
20th-century Swedish people